Hejiang may refer to:

 Hejiang Province, a former province in Northeast China
 Hejiang County, in Sichuan, China
 Hejiang Subdistrict (合江街道), a subdistrict of Shigu District, Hengyang, Hunan.